Greenoak International School (GIS) is a private primary and secondary school located in New GRA, Port Harcourt, Rivers State. The school caters for children of all
nationalities from 5 through to 16 years of age. GIS Primary was founded in September 2004 while GIS Secondary was founded in 2008. The school offers an International Education system, consisting of International Primary Curriculum (IPC), along with American and British curriculum programs. At present, 25% of the students are expatriates while 75% are Nigerians.

Administration
The Managing Director administers the overall affairs of GIS. The Principal is in charge of the day-to-day operation of the school. The Head of Administration and the Academic head are empowered to run their respective areas of duties while an Advisory Committee provides support and ideas to aid GIS’s progress. The Board of GIS is tasked with policy formulation for the wellbeing of the school.

Facilities
The following facilities can be found at Greenoak's school campus:

Furnished classrooms
Outdoor farms 
Fish pond
Multi-purpose hall
Libraries
Musical orchestra
Home Economics studio
Science laboratories
Zoological pond
Sports ground
Infirmary
Arts and Crafts studio
ICT suite

References

External links

Schools in Port Harcourt
Primary schools in Rivers State
Secondary schools in Rivers State